Summer Lightning and other stories is a 1986 collection of short stories by Jamaican writer Olive Senior. It won the 1987 Commonwealth Writers' Prize and was selected for the 2022 Big Jubilee Read, a list of 70 titles by Commonwealth writers.

In A History of Literature in the Caribbean: English- and Dutch-speaking countries the stories are described as "scintillating evocations of life in rural Jamaica". Booker Prize winner Marlon James included it in his "My 10 Favorite Books" in a 2016 New York Times piece, saying "The entire future of Caribbean prose is mapped out in this collection of stories, and I don't know a single Caribbean writer who doesn't reread it often".

Senior has said of this book: "I believe Summer Lightning to be a true expression of everyday life in that part of the world I describe, i.e., deep rural Jamaica, in terms of behaviours, beliefs, practices narrated and language used."

Story titles
The stories in the book are:
Summer lightning  
Love orange  
Country of the one eye god  
Ascot 
Bright Thursdays  
Real old time t'ing  
Do angels wear brassieres? 
Confirmation day 
The boy who loved ice cream  
Ballad

References

1986 short story collections
Jamaican short story collections